The elemental tetrad is a conceptual framework used in game design. Based on mechanics, aesthetics, stories and technology.

Description  
Mechanics describe the rules of the game, what players can and cannot do, while trying to achieve the game's goal and what happens when they try.

Story some sort of sequences of events that unfolds in a game and that can be linear and pre-scripted, or non-linear or even random.

Aesthetics define how the game looks, sounds and feels. Aesthetics has the most direct relationship to the player’s experience.

Technology is what makes the game work, as an essential medium in which other parts of tetrad work: where the aesthetics take place, in which the mechanics will occur, and through which the story will be told.

References 

Video game gameplay
Game terminology
Video game development